Edward Burrow may refer to:

Edward Burrow (priest) (1785–1861), English divine and miscellaneous writer
Edward Burrow (MP) for Cockermouth (UK Parliament constituency) in 1796
Edward J. Burrow (b. 8 June 1869, d. 19 September 1934) of Cheltenham, prolific author/publisher of guide books to regions and routes of Great Britain

References

See also
Edward Burrough (1634–1663), English Quaker leader
Edward Burroughs (1882–1934), British Anglican bishop
Edward Burrows (1917–1998), American conscientious objector
Edward Rupert Burrowes (1903–1966), Guyanese artist and art teacher